Geraldine González Martínez is a Chilean model and beauty pageant titleholder who was crowned Miss Universe Chile 2019. González represented Chile in Miss Universe 2019 but was unplaced.

Pageantry

Miss Universe Chile 
González competed in the 2018 edition of Miss Universe Chile where she was placed as the second runner-up behind Andrea Díaz. At her second attempt winning the title of Miss Universe Chile, she won the title of Miss Universe Chile 2019 representing Escuella SuperMiss on September 1, 2019 at the Casino Dreams in Punta Arenas, Región de Magallanes y de la Antártica Chilena, Chile.

Miss Universe 2019 
She represented Chile at the Miss Universe 2019 competition. The event was held at Tyler Perry Studios in Atlanta, Georgia, United States on December 8. Despite being a top favorite for the crown, González failed to enter the Top 20.

References

External links 
Miss Universo Chile on Instagram
Official Miss Universo Chile

Living people
Miss Universe 2019 contestants
Chilean beauty pageant winners
Chilean people
Miss Universo Chile winners
People from Santiago Province, Chile
1999 births